The 2009 Kenyan Super Cup was the inaugural edition of the tournament. The Kenyan football match-up pitted 2008 Kenyan Premier League champions Mathare United against 2008 FKF Cup winners Gor Mahia, who won their ninth title in the tournament.

Mathare United were thrashed 3–0, giving Gor Mahia the first ever Super Cup.

Match details

See also
2010 Kenyan Super Cup
Kenyan Premier League
FKF Cup

External links

Super Cup
2009